Censorship of Twitter refers to Internet censorship by governments that block access to Twitter. Twitter censorship also includes governmental notice and take down requests to Twitter, which Twitter enforces in accordance with its Terms of Service when a government or authority submits a valid removal request to Twitter indicating that specific content (such as a tweet) is illegal in their jurisdiction.

Restrictions based on government request
Twitter acts on complaints by third parties, including governments, to remove illegal content in accordance with the laws of the countries in which people use the service. On processing a successful complaint about an illegal tweet from "government officials, companies or another outside party", the social networking site will notify users from that country that they may not see it.

France

Following the posting of an antisemitic and racist posts by anonymous users, Twitter removed those posts from its service.  Lawsuits were filed by the Union of Jewish Students (UEJF), a French advocacy group and, on January 24, 2013, Judge Anne-Marie Sauteraud ordered Twitter to divulge the personally identifiable information about the user who posted the antisemitic post, charging that the posts violated French laws against hate speech.  Twitter responded by saying that it was "reviewing its options" regarding the French charges.  Twitter was given two weeks to comply with the court order before daily fines of €1,000 (about US$1,300) would be assessed.  Issues over jurisdiction arise, because Twitter has no offices nor employees within France, so it is unclear how a French court could sanction Twitter.

India

Twitter accounts spoofing the Prime Minister of India such as "PM0India", "Indian-pm" and "PMOIndiaa" were blocked in India in August 2012 following violence in Assam.

During the curfew in Jammu and Kashmir after Indian revocation of Jammu and Kashmir's special status on 5 August 2019, the Indian government approached Twitter to suspend accounts which were spreading rumours and anti-India content. This included the Twitter account of Syed Ali Shah Geelani, a Kashmiri separatist leader. On 3 August 2019,  Geelani tweeted "India is about to launch the biggest genocide in the history of mankind", leading which, his account was suspended on request by authorities. Two days later, on August 5, the Indian parliament passed resolution to  bifurcate the Jammu and Kashmir state into two union territories.

In February 2021, Twitter blocked hundreds of accounts that were posting about the Indian farmers protest from being accessed by users in India, by request of the Ministry of Home Affairs; the government ministry alleged that the accounts were spreading misinformation. Later that month, Twitter became subject to the national Social Media Ethics Code, which expects all social media companies operating in the country to remove content by request of the government within 36 hours, and appoint a local representative who is an Indian resident and passport holder

On May 18, 2021, Bhartiya Janata Party national spokesperson Sambit Patra posted an image alleged to be from an internal Indian National Congress (INC) document, detailing a social media campaign against Prime Minister Narendra Modi to criticize his handling of the COVID-19 pandemic in India. The INC disputed the posts and claimed that they were fabricated. Twitter subsequently marked the post as containing manipulated media.  The Ministry of Communications and Information Technology issued a request for Twitter to remove the label, alleging that Twitter's decision was "prejudged, prejudiced, and a deliberate attempt to colour the investigation by the local law enforcement agency". After Twitter refused to remove the label, its offices in New Delhi were raided by police.

In June 2021, Twitter lost its immunity as an "intermediary" under the Information Technology Act for its failure to appoint a local representative. It will be considered publisher of all materials posted on the platform. Later the same month, police in Uttar Pradesh registered a case against Twitter accusing it of distribution of child pornography. In March 2022, Delhi High Court questioned Twitter on why it would not block users posting objectionable content about Hindu Gods in the same way they blocked US President Donald Trump. The court sought a detailed explanation of Twitter's policies and asked them to file an affidavit.

In July 2022, Twitter started a lawsuit against the government of India after being ordered to remove multiple accounts and tweets that violated India's laws. Twitter is arguing that the laws are too restrictive and challenging the orders to block content. The company stated that some of the blocking demands "pertain to political content that is posted by official handles of political parties" and said that such orders are "a violation of the freedom of speech".

Israel

In 2016, access to comments by the American blogger Richard Silverstein about a criminal investigation, which involved a minor and therefore was under a gag order according to Israeli law, was blocked to Israeli IP addresses, following a request by Israel's Ministry of Justice.

Pakistan

As of May 2014, Twitter regularly disables the ability to view specific "tweets" inside Pakistan, at the request of the Government of Pakistan on the grounds that they are blasphemous, having done so five times in that month.

On November 25, 2017, the NetBlocks internet shutdown observatory and Digital Rights Foundation collected evidence of nation-wide blocking of Twitter alongside other social media services, imposed by the government in response to the religious political party Tehreek-e-Labaik protests. The technical investigation found that all major Pakistani fixed-line and mobile service providers were affected by the restrictions, which were lifted by the PTA the next day when protests abated following the resignation of Minister for Law and Justice Zahid Hamid.

Russia

On May 19, 2014, Twitter blocked a pro-Ukrainian political account for Russian users. It happened soon after a Russian official had threatened to ban Twitter entirely if it refused to delete "tweets" that violated Russian law, according to the Russian news site Izvestia.

On July 27, 2014, Twitter blocked an account belonging to a hacker collective that has leaked several internal Kremlin documents to the Internet.

On March 10, 2021, Russia's Federal Service for Supervision of Communications, Information Technology and Mass Media began throttling Twitter on all mobile devices and 50% of computers due to claims that Twitter regulatory board failed to remove illegal content that includes suicide, child pornography, and drug use. They issued Twitter could be blocked in Russia if it did not comply. In an e-mail statement Twitter stated it was "deeply concerned to throttle online public conversation."

From March to April 2021 Roskomnadzor considered a ban and the removal of the IP of Twitter from Russia completely. The government agency was met with denials and lack of urgency from the social network. Roskomnadzor has the necessary “technical capabilities” to completely remove Twitter from Russian domain. The severity of the situation occurred when over 3,000 posts containing child pornography in violation of Community Guidelines have been detected in 2021 by the agency that was later sent to Twitter regulatory board for verification. However Twitter sent no response back to the agency concerning the illegal content and has thereafter been charged of withholding its duty to maintain the social network's Community Guidelines.

On April 2, 2021, a Russian court found Twitter guilty on three counts of "violating regulations on restricting unlawful content," and ordered Twitter to pay $117,000 in fines. On April 5, 2021, Russia extended its throttling of Twitter until May 15, 2021. On May 17, 2021, Roskomnadzor said that Twitter had removed 91% of the banned content and backed off on blocking Twitter. Barring 600 posts still pending removal, the government agency also said they would continue throttling Twitter on Mobile Devices only saying that Twitter needed to remove all the banned items and in the future delete reportedly illegal posts within 24 hours for all restrictions to be lifted.

South Korea

In August 2010, the Government of South Korea tried to block certain content on Twitter due to the North Korean government opening a Twitter account. The North Korean Twitter account created on August 12, uriminzok, loosely translated to mean "our people" in Korean, acquired over 4,500 followers in less than one week.  On August 19, 2010, South Korea's state-run Communications Standards Commission banned the Twitter account for broadcasting "illegal information."  According to BBC US and Canada, experts claim that North Korea has invested in "information technology for more than 20 years" with knowledge of how to use social networking sites.  This appears to be "nothing new" for North Korea as the reclusive country has always published propaganda in its press, usually against South Korea, calling them "warmongers." With only 36 "tweets", the Twitter account was able to accumulate almost 9,000 followers.  To date, the South Korean Commission has banned 65 sites, including this Twitter account.

Tanzania

On October 29, 2020, the ISPs in Tanzania blocked social media in their country during  election week. Other social media sites have been unblocked since then, but Twitter remains blocked across all ISPs.

Turkey

On April 20, 2014, Frankfurter Allgemeine Zeitung, FAZ, reported Twitter had blocked two regime hostile accounts in Turkey, @Bascalan and @Haramzadeler333, both known for pointing out corruption. In fact, on March 26, 2014, Twitter announced that it started to use its Country Withheld Content tool for the first time in Turkey. As of June 2014, Twitter was withholding 14 accounts and "hundreds of tweets" in Turkey.

Turkey submitted the highest volume of removal requests to Twitter in 2014, 2015, 2016, 2017 and 2018. While in 2019 was third.

Some of the country's internet providers restricted access to Twitter during the 2023 Turkey–Syria earthquake and its aftermath. No official statement has been made on the reason for the restriction.

Venezuela

Twitter images were temporarily blocked in Venezuela in February 2014, along with other sites used to share images, including Pastebin.com and Zello, a walkie-talkie app. In response to the block, Twitter offered Venezuelan users a workaround to use their accounts via text message on their mobile phones.

On February 27, 2019, internet monitoring group NetBlocks reported the blocking of Twitter by state-run Internet provider CANTV for a duration of 40 minutes. The disruption followed the sharing of a tweet made by opposition leader Juan Guaidó linking to a highly critical recording posted to SoundCloud, which was also restricted access during the incident. The outages were found to be consistent with a pattern of brief, targeted filtering of other social platforms established during the country's presidential crisis.

Government blocking of Twitter access

In some cases, governments and other authorities take unilateral action to block Internet access to Twitter or its content.

, the governments of China, Iran, Myanmar, North Korea, Russia, Turkmenistan, and Uzbekistan have blocked access to Twitter.

China

Twitter is officially blocked in China; however, many Chinese people circumvent the block to use it. Even major Chinese companies and national medias, such as Huawei and CCTV, use Twitter through a government approved VPN. The official account of China's Ministry of Foreign Affairs started tweeting in English in December 2019, meanwhile dozens of Chinese diplomats, embassies and consulates run their accounts on Twitter. In 2010, Cheng Jianping was sentenced to one year in a labor camp for "retweeting" a comment that suggested boycotters of Japanese products should instead attack the Japanese pavilion at the 2010 Shanghai Expo. Her fiancé, who posted the initial comment, claims it was actually a satire of anti-Japanese sentiment in China. According to the report of the Washington Post, in 2019, state security officials visited some users in China to request them deleting tweets. The Chinese police would produce printouts of tweets and advise users to delete either the specific messages or their entire accounts. The New York Times described "the crackdown (of the twitter users in China) is unusually broad and punitive".  The targets of the crackdown even included those Twitter lurkers with very few followers. In 2019, a Chinese student at the University of Minnesota was arrested and sentenced to six months in prison when he returned to China, for posting tweets mocking Chinese paramount leader Xi Jinping while in US. On 3 July 2020, Twitter announced that all data and information requests for Hong Kong authorities were immediately paused after Hong Kong national security law, which was imposed by the Chinese government, went into effect. According to the official verdicts as of 2020, at least hundreds of Chinese were sentenced to prison due to their tweeting, retweeting and liking on Twitter. According to the documents obtained by the New York Times in 2021, Shanghai police were trying to use technology means to find out the true identities of Chinese users of specific accounts on foreign social media, including Twitter. In 2022, Peiter Zatko, Twitter's former head of security, accused Twitter of accepting funding from unnamed "Chinese entities", which gave them access to the information of users in China, and Twitter knew that could endanger these users. Zatko also disclosed that FBI notified Twitter of at least one Chinese agent in the company.

Iran

In 2009, during 2009 Iranian presidential election, the Iranian government blocked Twitter due to fear of protests being organised. In September 2013, the blocking of both Twitter and Facebook was briefly lifted without notice due to a technical error, but within a day the sites were blocked again.

North Korea

In April 2016, North Korea started to block Twitter "in a move underscoring its concern with the spread of online information". Anyone who tries to access it without special permission from the North Korean government, including foreign visitors and residents, is subject to punishment.

Russia
On 26 February 2022, during the invasion of Ukraine, Russia began restricting access to Twitter, with global internet monitor NetBlocks observing that the censorship measure was in effect "across multiple providers." Despite direct connections being restricted, Russians could still access Twitter via VPN services. The decision was subsequently announced by Roskomnadzor as a measure to curtail information on Twitter and Facebook that did not align with the Government of Russia's positions.

Turkmenistan
, foreign news and opposition websites are blocked in Turkmenistan, and international social networks such as Twitter are "often inaccessible".

Uzbekistan
On July 2, 2021, Uzbekistan blocked access to Twitter along with TikTok, VKontakte, and Skype after stating that they had violated a new personal data law. This also came amid new laws passed that criminalized insulting or slandering the president online, amid an upcoming presidential election later that year. The sites were briefly unblocked on 16 March 2022 before being blocked again hours later.

Egypt (2011 temporary block)

Twitter was inaccessible in Egypt on January 25, 2011, during the 2011 Egyptian protests. Some news reports blamed the government of Egypt for blocking it. Vodafone Egypt, Egypt's largest mobile network operator, denied responsibility for the action in a tweet. Twitter's news releases did not state who the company believed instituted the block. As of January 26, Twitter was still confirming that the service was blocked in Egypt. On January 27, various reports claimed that access to the entire Internet from within Egypt had been shut down.

Shortly after the Internet shutdown, engineers at Google, Twitter, and SayNow, a voice-messaging startup company acquired by Google in January, announced the Speak To Tweet service. Google stated in its official blog that the goal of the service was to assist Egyptian protesters in staying connected during the Internet shutdown. Users could phone in a "tweet" by leaving a voicemail and use the Twitter hashtag #Egypt. These comments could be accessed without an Internet connection by dialing the same designated phone numbers. Those with Internet access could listen to the comments by visiting twitter.com/speak2tweet.

On February 2, 2011, connectivity was re-established by the four main Egyptian service providers. A week later, the heavy filtering that occurred at the height of the revolution had ended.

Nigeria (2021–2022 temporary block)

From 5 June 2021 to 13 January 2022, the government of Nigeria officially banned Twitter, which restricted it from operating in the country. The ban occurred after Twitter deleted tweets made by, and temporarily suspended, the Nigerian president Muhammadu Buhari, warning the southeastern people of Nigeria, predominantly Igbo people, of a potential repeat of the 1967 Biafran Civil War due to the ongoing insurgency in Southeastern Nigeria. The Nigerian government claimed that the deletion of the president's tweets factored into their decision, but it was ultimately based on "a litany of problems with the social media platform in Nigeria, where misinformation and fake news spread through it have had real world violent consequences", citing the persistent use of the platform for activities that are capable of undermining Nigeria's corporate existence.

Turkey (2014 temporary block)

On March 21, 2014, access to Twitter in Turkey was temporarily blocked, after a court ordered that "protection measures" be applied to the service. This followed earlier remarks by Prime Minister Tayyip Erdogan who vowed to "wipe out Twitter" following damaging allegations of corruption in his inner circle. However, on March 27, 2014, Istanbul Anatolia 18th Criminal Court of Peace suspended the above-mentioned court order. Turkey's constitutional court later ruled that the ban is illegal. Two weeks after the Turkish government blocked the site, the Twitter ban was lifted. However, Twitter reports that the government of Turkey accounts for more than 52 percent of all content removal requests worldwide.

Suspending and restricting users

Under Twitter's Terms of Service which requiring users agreement, Twitter retains the right to temporarily or permanently suspend user accounts based on violations. One such example took place on December 18, 2017, when it banned the accounts belonging to Paul Golding, Jayda Fransen, Britain First, and the Traditionalist Worker Party. Donald Trump, the former President of the United States,  faced a limited degree of censorship in 2019, and following the 2021 storming of the United States Capitol has been completely suspended on January 8, 2021, according to an interpretation of two tweets by moderation. Trump has used the platform extensively as a means of communication, and has escalated tensions with other nations through his tweets. On January 8, 2021, at 6:21 EST, Twitter permanently suspended Trump's personal Twitter account. The President then posted four status updates on the POTUS Twitter account which were subsequently removed. Twitter said they would not suspend government accounts, but will "instead take action to limit their use."

Twitter's policies have been described as subject to manipulation by users who may coordinate to flag politically controversial tweets as allegedly violating the platform's policies, resulting in deplatforming of controversial users. The platform has long been criticized for its failure to provide details of underlying alleged policy violations to the subjects of Twitter suspensions and bans.

In 2018, Twitter rolled out a "quality filter" that hid content and users deemed "low quality" from search results and limited their visibility, leading to accusations of shadow banning. After conservatives claimed it censors users from the political right, Alex Thompson, a writer for VICE, confirmed that many prominent Republican politicians had been "shadow banned" by the filter. Twitter later acknowledged the problem, stating that the filter had a software bug that would be fixed in the near future.

In October 2020, Twitter prevented users from tweeting about a New York Post article about the Biden–Ukraine conspiracy theory, relating to emails about Hunter Biden allegedly introducing a Ukrainian businessman to his father, Joe Biden. Senators Marsha Blackburn and Ted Cruz described the blocking of the New York Post on Twitter as "election interference". The New York Times reported in September 2021 that a Federal Election Commission inquiry into a complaint about the matter found Twitter had acted with a valid commercial reason, rather than a political purpose. The FEC inquiry also found that allegations Twitter had violated election laws by allegedly shadow banning Republicans and other means were "vague, speculative and unsupported by the available information."

See also

 Deplatforming
 Shadow banning
 Twitter suspensions
 Twitter Files

References

 
Twitter
Twitter